Calcio is a town and comune in the province of Bergamo, Lombardy, Italy.

Among the churches in the town is the parish church of San Vittore.

Transport
 Cividate al Piano-Calcio railway station

References

Cities and towns in Lombardy